King Kong is an American indie rock music project fronted by musician Ethan Buckler. Buckler left his previous band, Slint, in 1989 to start a new musical project. King Kong's first release, Movie Star, featured the other three members of Slint, David Pajo, Britt Walford, and Brian McMahan. King Kong would go on to feature an ever-changing lineup of performers including John McEntire, David Grubbs, and Peter Townsend.

The song "Movie Star" was used in the end credits of the 2014 Slint documentary, Breadcrumb Trail.

In 2018, King Kong released three singles: "60s Apartment Building Balcony", "Pawnshopolis", and "Pigeon Man". Each one was accompanied with a music video.

On March 8, 2021, Jimmy Fallon included Old Man On The Bridge in his "Do Not Play" segment on The Tonight Show.

Discography

Studio albums 
Old Man on The Bridge (1991, Homestead Records)
Funny Farm (1993, Drag City)
Me Hungry (1995, Drag City)
Kingdom of Kong (1997, Drag City)
The Big Bang (2002, Drag City)
Buncha Beans (2007, Drag City)

Compilations 
Breeding Ground (2001, Sea Note)

Singles & EPs 
Movie Star EP (1989, Self-released)
"Bring It On" (1990, Trash Flow Records)
"Hot Dog Days" (1994, Drag City)
"60s Apartment Building Balcony" (2018, Drag City)
"Pawnshopolis" (2018, Drag City)
"Pigeon Man" (2018, Drag City)

References

External links 
 [ King Kong] at AllMusic
 King Kong on Myspace
 

Rock music groups from Kentucky
Musical groups from Louisville, Kentucky
Drag City (record label) artists
1989 establishments in Kentucky
Musical groups established in 1989